Central Park is a large public park in New York City, United States.

Central Park may also refer to:

Places

Australia
 Central Park, Sydney, a major urban renewal project in Sydney

Canada
 Central Park, Alberta, a community, Alberta
 Central Park (Burnaby), a park in Burnaby, British Columbia
 Central Park (Ottawa), a park in central Ottawa, Ontario
 Central Park, Ottawa, a neighbourhood in Ottawa
 Central Park (Winnipeg), a park and a neighbourhood in Winnipeg, Manitoba
 Central Memorial Park, a park in central Calgary, Alberta

China
 People's Park (Guangzhou) or Central Park

Finland
 Central Park (Helsinki), a park in Helsinki, Finland

India 
Central Park, Jaipur, a park in Jaipur, India
Central Park, Kharghar, a park in Mumbai, India
Central Park (Kolkata), a park in Kolkata, India
Sunder Nursery or Central Park, a heritage park in Delhi, India

Japan 
Shinjuku Central Park, Japan

Kazakhstan
 Central Park (Almaty), a park in Almaty, Kazakhstan

Peru
 Miraflores Central Park, a park in Miraflores, Lima

Romania
 Cluj-Napoca Central Park, Romania

Russia
 Central Park (Tolyatti), Russia

South Korea
 Songdo Central Park, Incheon, South Korea

Taiwan
 Central Park (Kaohsiung), a park in Kaohsiung, Taiwan

United Kingdom
Central Park, Chelmsford, a park in Chelmsford, Essex, England
Central Park, East Ham, a park in East Ham, London
Central Park, Peterborough, Cambridgeshire
Central Park, Plymouth, a park in Devon, England
Central Park, Scunthorpe, a park in Scunthorpe, Lincolnshire
Central Park, Wallasey, Merseyside

United States
 Central Park, Birmingham, Alabama, a neighborhood in Ensley, Alabama
 Central Park, Glendale, California
 Central Park (San Mateo), a park near downtown San Mateo, California
 Central Park, a park in Santa Clarita, California
 Fremont Central Park, Fremont, California
 Central Park, Denver, a neighborhood in Denver, Colorado, formerly known as Stapleton 
 Central Park, a park in Largo, Florida
 Doral Central Park, in Doral, Florida
 Central Park (Atlanta), a park in the Old Fourth Ward neighborhood of Atlanta, Georgia
 Garfield Park (Chicago) in Chicago, Illinois, originally called Central Park
 Central Park, Louisville, a park in Louisville, Kentucky
 Central Park, Buffalo, New York a neighborhood in Buffalo, New York
 Bethpage, New York or Central Park, Nassau County, New York
 Loring Park or Central Park, in Minneapolis, Minnesota
 Central Park, Johnstown, Pennsylvania
 Central Park, Washington, a census-designated place in Grays Harbor County
 Central Park, Wisconsin, an unincorporated area in Kenosha County

Structures

Stadiums
 Central Park, Cowdenbeath, a football stadium in Cowdenbeath, Scotland
 Central Park (Pittsburgh), a 1921–1925 baseball stadium in Pittsburgh, Pennsylvania, US
 Central Park (Wigan), a former rugby league stadium in Wigan, Greater Manchester
Central Park Stadium, a greyhound stadium in Kent

Other structures
 Central Park (Hong Kong), a private housing estate in Hong Kong
 Central Park (shopping complex), a shopping complex in Fredericksburg, Virginia
 Central Park (skyscraper), in Perth, Western Australia
 Central Park Jakarta, a mixed-use complex in Jakarta, Indonesia
 Central Park Public School, a public elementary school in Markham, Ontario

Film and television
 Central Park (1932 film), an American crime film
 Central Park (2017 film), a film featuring Marina Squerciati
 Central Park (TV series), an American musical animated sitcom

Other uses
 Central Park (Allentown, Pennsylvania), a defunct amusement park (1892-1951)
 Central Park (pinball), a 1966 Gottlieb pinball machine
 Central Park, a train operated by Amtrak as part of the Clocker service

See also
 Central Park Station (disambiguation)
 Park Central (disambiguation)
 Central Perk